is a Japanese footballer currently playing as a forward for Matsumoto Yamaga.

Career statistics

Club

Notes

References

External links

2000 births
Living people
Association football people from Saitama Prefecture
Japanese footballers
Association football forwards
J2 League players
J3 League players
Matsumoto Yamaga FC players
Thespakusatsu Gunma players